Zenochloris is a genus of beetles in the family Cerambycidae, containing the following species:

 Zenochloris barbicauda Bates, 1892
 Zenochloris densepunctata Fuchs, 1976
 Zenochloris freyi Fuchs, 1966
 Zenochloris major Chemsak & Hovore, in Eya, 2010
 Zenochloris paradoxa Bates, 1885
 Zenochloris vandykei Linsley, 1935

References

Trachyderini
Cerambycidae genera